Starting as the B-side of Gene Autry's "Mexicali Rose", penned by Autry, 'You're the Only Star in My Blue Heaven' was also popular in Hillbilly jukeboxes and radios in the mid-late 1930s. After the Columbia Broadcasting System, Inc. (CBS) purchased ARC and Gene's contract in December 1938. The younger version is over 20 seconds shorter.

At first, only Roy Acuff and his Crazy Tennesseans recorded the song (Roy on October 21, 1936)., and in 1938 by The Delmore Brothers. It was also recorded by Elvis Presley and Jerry Lee Lewis during the Million Dollar Quartet sessions at Sun Recording Studios. Amongst other recordings are those by Connee Boswell (1939), and Dick Todd (1938).

References

Elvis Presley songs
Gene Autry songs
Songs written by Gene Autry
1936 songs